Madmans Esprit is a South Korean black metal band, influenced by visual kei and solo project of vocalist Kyuho, formed in 2010 in Seoul. Kyuho identifies their style as "Depressive Suicidal Blackened Pop".

Career 
Kyuho formed Madmans Esprit in 2010 in Seoul and moved to Berlin a few years later and recorded the albums Nacht, distributed by Gan Shin Records and released in October 2018 and 무의식 의 의식화 (Conscientization of Unconsciousness). They also toured Europe in 2017. However, Kyuho had to return to his hometown because of military service. Kyuho said he has always been influenced by Japanese visual kei. Some of the project's influences are Dir En Grey, Opeth, Radiohead and X Japan.

Current members 
 Kyuho Lee (叫號) - vocal and music

He is also guitarist of the band "ms. Isohp romatem", established by Juho. In addition, he is fluent in the Korean, Japanese, English and German languages.

Live support members 
 Arc - guitar
 Juho - guitar
 Geon - bass
 Yoel - drums

Former members
2010-2013: 
 睛彬 (Jungbin) - guitar
 蘭實 (Nansil) - bass
 滸震 (Hojin) - drums

Former Live support members
2018-2019:
 Senyt - guitar
 Eun Chae - bass
 Confyverse - drums
 Tom Haberland - bass

2017-2018:
 Mario - guitar

Discography

References

External links
 Official website

South Korean black metal musical groups
2010 establishments in South Korea
Musical groups from Seoul
Musical groups established in 2010